In human neuroanatomy, the hypothalamotegmental tract is a pathway from the hypothalamus to the reticular formation. Axons from the posterior hypothalamus descend through the mesencephalic and pontine reticular formations. They connect with reticular neurons important in visceral and autonomic activity. The tract is a continuation of the medial forebrain bundle in the lateral portion of the tegmentum. It is not visible without special stains.

See also
Mammillothalamic tract
Medial forebrain bundle
Midbrain reticular formation

References

Hypothalamus